William Wainwright may refer to:

 William John Wainwright (1855–1931), Birmingham artist
 William Wainwright (land developer) (1836–?), developer of Rockaway Beach, Queens in New York
 Bill Wainwright (1908-2000), British communist activist
 William L. Wainwright (born 1947), member of the North Carolina General Assembly
 William Orbit (William Mark Wainwright, born 1956), English musician and record producer